Beatrix Karl (born 10 December 1967) is an Austrian academic and politician. A former member of the National Council, she served as Minister for Science and Research (2010–2011) and as Minister of Justice (2011–2013) in  the first Faymann government.

Early life and career 

Karl was born in 1967 in Graz, Styria, and grew up in Bad Gleichenberg. She studied law at the University of Graz, completing a Magister degree in 1991 and a doctorate in 1995. She then worked at the Max Planck Institute for Social Law and Social Policy in Munich. Starting in 2001 she was an assistant professor, and full professor from 2003, at her alma mater.

Politics 

Karl unsuccessfully ran in the 2005 Styrian state election for the Austrian People's Party (ÖVP). In the 2006 Austrian legislative election she won a seat on the National Council and was re-elected in 2008. From 2009 – 2010 she was general secretary of the ÖVP's labour organisation.

On 26 January 2010 Karl was appointed to the cabinet of Werner Faymann, succeeding Johannes Hahn as Federal Minister for Science and Research. She made plans to re-introduce nationwide tuition fees for all university students, among other cost-saving measures.

She moved to lead the Ministry of Justice in an April 2011 cabinet reshuffle. Karl was widely criticised after a 14-year old, who had been incorrectly detained, was sexually assaulted in jail. Critics accused her of ignoring the presumption of innocence, experts stated that lengthy pre-trial detention for minors was unacceptable. She later admitted that her ministry had mishandled the situation.

Karl was not reappointed in the second Faymann government, and resumed her membership of parliament until the 2017 election. She was also a candidate in the 2014 European Parliament election, but the ÖVP did not win enough seats for her to join the European Parliament.

In 2018 she was selected as Austria's government commissioner for Expo 2020 in Dubai.

She is Dame of Honor of the Order of St. George.

References

External links 
 

1967 births
Living people
Academic staff of the University of Graz
University of Graz alumni
Politicians from Graz
Austrian People's Party politicians
Members of the National Council (Austria)
Government ministers of Austria
Women government ministers of Austria
Female justice ministers
Austrian expatriates in Germany
Justice ministers of Austria